MYOB or M.Y.O.B. may refer to:
 M.Y.O.B. (album), by American singer Deborah Gibson
 M.Y.O.B. (TV series), an American comedy
 MYOB (company),  an Australian multinational corporation
 MYOB (football club), a Surinamese association football club
 Mind your own business, an English phrase

See also
 Mind your own business (disambiguation)